The third running of the Milan–San Remo cycling classic was held on 4 April 1909. The race was won by Luigi Ganna, the first Italian to win Milan–San Remo. 104 riders started the race; 57 finished.

Summary
The success of foreign riders in the two previous editions had made the race gain popularity. For the first time, more than a hundred starters signed up. 104 riders, of which 20 Belgians and French, were at the start in Milan just before six in the morning. It was a cold day and rain had made the unpaved pre-war roads very muddy.

Luigi Ganna had broken away on the Passo del Turchino, before half-race, and was subsequently joined and dropped by Emile Georget and Giovanni Cuniolo. In Savona, Georget took a wrong way – he said a clerk signalled him in the wrong direction – and was passed by Ganna who powered on solo to San Remo. At the finish, Ganna, a former bricklayer, was welcomed by an enthusiastic crowd and became the first Italian winner of Milan–San Remo. Georget finished second at 3 minutes, Cuniolo third at 18 minutes. For the first time, the speed average exceeded 30 km/h.

Results

References

Milan–San Remo
Milan - San Remo, 1909
Milan - San Remo
Milan - San Remo